Irina Khromacheva was the defending champion, but lost in the quarterfinals to Jana Čepelová.

Čepelová won the title, defeating Danka Kovinić in the final, 6–4, 6–3.

Seeds

Draw

Finals

Top half

Bottom half

References
Main Draw

Sport11 Ladies Open - Singles